Chiloschista, commonly known as starfish orchids and abbreviated Chsch., is a genus of usually leafless, epiphytic or lithophytic orchids found in India, Southeast Asia and Australia.

Description
Orchids in the genus Chiloschista are epiphytic or lithophytic, usually leafless monopodial herbs with flat, green, photosynthetic roots radiating from a short, central rhizome. The flowers are arranged on long, thin flowering stems, open sporadically in groups and only last for a few hours to one or two days. They are small and resupinate, with the sepals and petals more or less similar in size and shape to each other but different from the labellum which has three lobes. The side lobes of the labellum are erect and larger than the middle lobe which is slipper-shaped.

Taxonomy and naming
The genus Chiloschista was first described in 1832 by John Lindley in Edwards's Botanical Register. The name Chiloschista is derived from the Ancient Greek words  meaning "lip" or "rim" and  meaning "split" or "divided". 

Twenty species of Chiloschista are recognised by the World Checklist of Selected Plant Families as at December 2018:
 Chiloschista extinctoriformis Seidenf., Opera Bot. 95: 178 (1988)
 Chiloschista exuperei (Guillaumin) Garay, Bot. Mus. Leafl. 23: 166 (1972)
 Chiloschista fasciata (F.Muell.) Seidenf. & Ormerod, Opera Bot. 124: 64 (1995)
 Chiloschista glandulosa Blatt. & McCann, J. Bombay Nat. Hist. Soc. 35: 488 (1932)
 Chiloschista godefroyana (Rchb.f.) Schltr., Repert. Spec. Nov. Regni Veg. Beih. 4: 275 (1919)
 Chiloschista guangdongensis Z.H.Tsi, Acta Phytotax. Sin. 22: 481 (1984)
 Chiloschista loheri Schltr., Bot. Jahrb. Syst. 56: 491 (1921)
 Chiloschista lunifera (Rchb.f.) J.J.Sm., Orch. Java: 553 (1905)
 Chiloschista parishii Seidenf., Opera Bot. 95: 176 (1988)
 Chiloschista phyllorhiza (F.Muell.) Schltr. – white starfish orchid, Australia
 Chiloschista ramifera Seidenf., Opera Bot. 95: 179 (1988)
 Chiloschista rodriguezii Cavestro & Ormerod, Orchidophile (Asnières) 166: 180 (2005)
 Chiloschista segawae (Masam.) Masam. & Fukuy., Bot. Mag. (Tokyo) 52: 247 (1938)
 Chiloschista sweelimii Holttum, Orchid Rev. 74: 147 (1966)
 Chiloschista taeniophyllum (J.J.Sm.) Schltr., Bot. Jahrb. Syst. 56: 492 (1921)
 Chiloschista treubii (J.J.Sm.) Schltr., Bot. Jahrb. Syst. 56: 492 (1921)
 Chiloschista trudelii Seidenf., Orchidee (Hamburg) 38: 310 (1987) 
 Chiloschista usneoides (D.Don) Lindl., Edwards's Bot. Reg. 18: t. 1522 (1832) 
 Chiloschista viridiflava Seidenf., Opera Bot. 95: 175 (1988)
 Chiloschista yunnanensis Schltr., Repert. Spec. Nov. Regni Veg. Beih. 4: 74 (1919)

References

 
Vandeae genera